Lang is a village in the Canadian province of Saskatchewan within the Rural Municipality of Scott No. 98 and Census Division No. 2. The village is located approximately 70 km southeast of the City of Regina.

History 
Lang was named after George Macdonald Lang (1860 to 1930), a civil engineer and architect, who was employed by the Canadian Pacific Railway between 1893 and 1906. Lang incorporated as a village on July 27, 1906.

Demographics 

Education

Students from Lang attend school in Milestone, of the Prairie Valley School Division.

Notable people
Dennis Sobchuk, played in the NHL for the Detroit Red Wings and Quebec Nordiques.  Also played in the WHA for the Cincinnati Stingers, Edmonton Oilers, and Phoenix Roadrunners.
Gene Sobchuk, played on one game in the National Hockey League for the Vancouver Canucks and played in WHA for the Cincinnati Stingers and Phoenix Roadrunners

See also 
 List of communities in Saskatchewan
 Villages of Saskatchewan

Footnotes

External links

Villages in Saskatchewan
Scott No. 98, Saskatchewan
Division No. 2, Saskatchewan